Bethanie Mattek-Sands and Lucie Šafářová were the defending champions, but lost in the second round to Andreja Klepač and María José Martínez Sánchez.

Gabriela Dabrowski and Xu Yifan won the title, defeating Sania Mirza and Barbora Strýcová in the final, 6–4, 6–3.

Mattek-Sands retained the No. 1 doubles ranking after the other contenders for the top ranking at the beginning of the tournament (Kristina Mladenovic, Ekaterina Makarova and Elena Vesnina) all lost in the quarterfinals.

Seeds

Draw

Finals

Top half

Bottom half

References

External links
 Main Draw

Miami Open - Doubles
2017 Miami Open